The 1952–53 season was the 69th Scottish football season in which Dumbarton competed at national level, entering the Scottish Football League, the Scottish Cup and the Scottish League Cup.  In addition Dumbarton competed in the Stirlingshire Cup.

Scottish League

An uncharacteristic good start to the league campaign saw 5 points taken from the first 3 games, but this form was unable to be maintained and Dumbarton finished in a mid-table 10th place, 16 behind champions Stirling Albion.

Scottish Cup

In the Scottish Cup, there was a quick exit at the first hurdle with Dumbarton losing to Cowdenbeath.

Scottish League Cup

Despite an unbeaten home record in the League Cup sectional games, with two wins and a draw - three away defeats, including a 1-11 thrashing by Ayr United (matching Dumbarton's heaviest defeat recorded in the 1925-26 season) ensured that Dumbarton finished 3rd of 4, resulting in no further progress in this competition.

Stirlingshire Cup
However, silverware was achieved, with a first win in the Stirlingshire Cup, where Dumbarton defeated East Stirling in the final.

Friendlies

Player statistics

|}

Source:

Transfers

Players in

Players out 

Source:

Reserve team
Dumbarton only played one competitive 'reserve' fixture - in the Second XI Cup - but lost in the first round to St Mirren.

References

Dumbarton F.C. seasons
Scottish football clubs 1952–53 season